Leander de Cordova (5 December 1877 – 19 September  1969) was a Jamaican-born American actor and film director. He was the brother of Rudolph de Cordova. He was the son of Altamont de Cordova and Katherine Lewis. He was also the grandnephew of Jacob de Cordova.

Selected filmography

Acted
 The Penal Code (1932) – Isaac Lewin
 Dick Tracy (1937, Serial) – Stevens (uncredited)
 The Emperor's Candlesticks (1937) – Bidder (uncredited)
 Midnight (1939) – Footman (uncredited)
 Torture Ship (1939) – Ezra Matthews
 Zorro's Fighting Legion (1939, Serial) – Felipe
 The Phantom Cowboy (1941) – Don Jose Toreno (uncredited)
 Prairie Pioneers (1941) – Father Garcia (uncredited)
 Mission to Moscow (1943) – Heckler (uncredited)
 The Laramie Trail (1944) – Esteban
 The Gay Senorita (1945) – Padre Anselmo (uncredited)
 Yolanda and the Thief (1945) – Elderly Butler (uncredited)
 Gilda (1946) – Servant (uncredited)
 Big Town (1946) – Minor Role (uncredited)
 Fear in the Night (1947) – Man (uncredited)
 Danger Street (1947) – Minor Role (uncredited)
 A Double Life (1947) – Audience Member (uncredited)
 Albuquerque (1948) – Townsman (uncredited)
 Casbah (1948) – Doorman (uncredited)
 The Mysterious Desperado (1949) – Padre
 Tough Assignment (1949) – Schultz
 According to Mrs. Hoyle (1951) – Pastor J. Berland

Directed
 A Scream in the Night (1919)
 Polly With a Past (1920)
 Love, Honor and Obey (1920)
 She (1925)
 After the Fog (1929)
 Trails of the Golden West (1931)

References

External links

 

1877 births
1979 deaths
20th-century Jamaican male actors
Jamaican film directors
People from Kingston, Jamaica
Jamaican male film actors
Expatriate male actors in the United States
Emigrants from British Jamaica to the United States